The 2012 Alcorn State Braves football team represented Alcorn State University in the 2012 NCAA Division I FCS football season. The Braves were led by first-year head coach Jay Hopson, and played their home games at Casem-Spinks Stadium. Hopson is the first non-black head coach to coach at a historically black university in either the MEAC or SWAC. They were a member of the East Division of the Southwestern Athletic Conference (SWAC) and finished the season with an overall record of four wins and seven losses (4–7, 4–5 SWAC).

Media
All Braves games were broadcast live on WPRL 91.7 FM.

Schedule

References

Alcorn State
Alcorn State Braves football seasons
Alcorn State Braves football